Lapeer may refer to a location in the United States:

 Lapeer, Kansas
 Lapeer, Michigan
 Lapeer County, Michigan
 Lapeer Township, Michigan
 Lapeer, New York

See also 
 USS Lapeer (PC-1138)